Dr. Michael D. Gershon is the author of The Second Brain and the chairman of the department of anatomy and cell biology at Columbia University.

See also
Ulcerative colitis
Enteric nervous system
Auerbach's plexus

External links
Research summary page of Columbia University
The Other Brain Also Deals With Many Woes, New York Times, 23 August 2005

Living people
1938 births
Place of birth missing (living people)
Columbia University faculty